Dennis Hadžikadunić (born 9 July 1998) is a Bosnian professional footballer who plays as a centre-back for La Liga club Mallorca, on loan from Rostov, and the Bosnia and Herzegovina national team.

Hadžikadunić started his professional career at Malmö FF, who sent him on loan to Trelleborgs FF in 2018. Later that year, he joined Rostov, who loaned him back to Malmö FF in 2022 and to Mallorca in 2023.

A former Swedish youth international, Hadžikadunić made his senior international debut for Bosnia and Herzegovina in 2020, earning 19 caps since.

Club career

Malmö FF
Hadžikadunić started playing football at a local club BK Olympic, before joining youth academy of his hometown club Malmö FF in 2012. In September 2016, he signed his first professional contract with the team. He won his first trophy with the club on 26 October, when they were crowned league champions. Four days later, he made his professional debut against Gefle at the age of 18.

In January 2018, he was loaned to Trelleborgs FF until the end of season.

Rostov
In July, Hadžikadunić was transferred to Russian side Rostov. He made his official debut for the club against Dynamo Moscow on 10 November. On 8 July 2020, he scored his first professional goal against Ufa.

In March 2022, he was sent on a season-long loan to his former club Malmö FF.

In January 2023, he was sent on a six-month loan to Spanish outfit Mallorca.

International career
Despite representing Sweden at all youth levels, Hadžikadunić decided to play for Bosnia and Herzegovina at senior level.

In September 2020, his request to change sports citizenship from Swedish to Bosnian was approved by FIFA. Later that month, he received his first senior call-up, for UEFA Euro 2020 qualifying play-offs against Northern Ireland and 2020–21 UEFA Nations League games against the Netherlands and Poland. He debuted against the Netherlands on 11 October.

Career statistics

Club

International

Honours
Malmö FF
Allsvenskan: 2016, 2017
Svenska Cupen: 2021–22

References

External links

1998 births
Living people
Footballers from Malmö
Swedish people of Bosnia and Herzegovina descent
Citizens of Bosnia and Herzegovina through descent
Swedish footballers
Sweden youth international footballers
Sweden under-21 international footballers
Swedish expatriate footballers
Bosnia and Herzegovina footballers
Bosnia and Herzegovina international footballers
Bosnia and Herzegovina expatriate footballers
Association football central defenders
Malmö FF players
Trelleborgs FF players
FC Rostov players
RCD Mallorca players
Allsvenskan players
Russian Premier League players
La Liga players
Expatriate footballers in Russia
Expatriate footballers in Spain
Swedish expatriate sportspeople in Russia
Swedish expatriate sportspeople in Spain
Bosnia and Herzegovina expatriate sportspeople in Sweden
Bosnia and Herzegovina expatriate sportspeople in Russia
Bosnia and Herzegovina expatriate sportspeople in Spain